Jørgen Hare (15 June 1923 – 14 June 2007) was a Danish sports shooter. He competed in the 50 m rifle, prone event at the 1952 Summer Olympics.

References

External links
 

1923 births
2007 deaths
Danish male sport shooters
Olympic shooters of Denmark
Shooters at the 1952 Summer Olympics
People from Guldborgsund Municipality
Sportspeople from Region Zealand